Temne (also Themne, Timne) is a language of the Mel branch of the Niger–Congo language family. Temne speakers live mostly in the Northern Province and Western Area, Sierra Leone. Temne people can be found in a number of other West African countries as well, including Guinea and The Gambia. Some Temnes have also migrated beyond West Africa seeking educational and professional opportunities, especially in Great Britain, the United States, and Egypt.

Phonology
Temne is a tonal language, with four tones. Among consonants, Temne distinguishes dental and alveolar, but, unusually, the dental consonants are apical and the alveolar consonants are laminal (and slightly affricated), the opposite of the general pattern, though one found also in the nearby language Limba.

Consonants

Vowels

Writing
The alphabet of Temne includes the following characters and digraphs:

Earlier, Ȧȧ was used instead of Ʌʌ

Further reading

References

Bibliography
Bai-Sharka, Abou (1986) Temne names and proverbs (Stories and songs from Sierra Leone vol. 19). Freetown: People’s Educational Association of Sierra Leone.
Kamarah, Sheikh Umarr (2007) A descriptive grammar of KʌThemnɛ (Temne). Munich: Lincom Europa.
Peace Corps (1987) Sierra Leone Temne Language Manual. Washington, DC: Peace Corps.
Turay, Abdul Karim (1989) Temne stories. Köln: Rüdiger Köppe Verlag.
Wilson, W.A.A. (1961) An outline of the Temne language. London: University of London / SOAS.
Yillah, M. Sorie (1992) Temne phonology and morphology'' [Unpublished thesis. New York: City University of New York]. Ann Arbor: UMI.

External links
Temne Words and Phrases
Grammar of the Temne language, 1864 - Rev. C. F. Schlenker
CIA Sierra Leone file
PanAfrican L10n page on Temne
Listening example: Kassirie Stories
Temne page on JoshuaProject.net
Resources in the Temne language
OLAC resources in and about the Timne language
Temne story "Mr. Spider and the Rotten Skin" with English rough translation
Glottolog page for Timne
Peace Corps Sierra Leone Temne Language Manual
Lets Learn Thaymneh (Temne)

Mel languages
Languages of Sierra Leone